The Singapore Ambassador to the United States is the official representative of the Republic of Singapore to the United States of America.

List of representatives

See also
 United States–Singapore relations
 United States Ambassador to Singapore
 Embassy of Singapore, Washington, D.C.
 Singapore Ambassador to Russia
 Singapore Ambassador to China
 List of High Commissioners and Ambassadors of Singapore

References 

 
United States
Singapore